Claire Harvey (born ) is a British Paralympic sportsperson. She began as a sitting volleyball player, before switching to track and field athletics where she competes in F55 classification throwing events.

Sitting volleyball career
Harvey was part of the Great Britain women's national sitting volleyball team and is now a track and field athlete for Great Britain. She competed at the 2012 Summer Paralympics where the team finished last. On club level, she played for London Lynx in 2012.

Athletics career
In 2015, Harvey switched sports to compete in track and field athletics. She competed at the 2015 IPC Athletics World Championships in Doha where she came fourth in the shot put and eighth in the javelin throw. Although Harvey qualified in the discus for the Great Britain team for the 2016 Summer Paralympics in Rio, she was forced to withdraw from the team due to injury.

See also
 Great Britain at the 2012 Summer Paralympics

References

1974 births
Living people
Volleyball players at the 2012 Summer Paralympics
Paralympic athletes of Great Britain
British sportswomen
Paralympic volleyball players of Great Britain
Women's sitting volleyball players
British female discus throwers